Two genera are named Bleekeria after Pieter Bleeker:

 Bleekeria, a genus of fishes in the family Ammodytidae.
 A synonym for the genus Alchornea of flowering plants.